Mark Stahl (born August 12, 1951) is an American former professional off-road and stock car racing driver. He competed in the NASCAR Winston Cup Series and the ARCA Re/MAX Series, and is a four-time winner of the Baja 1000 off-road race, twice winning the event overall.

Career
Born in San Diego, California, Stahl began his professional racing career in off-road racing; he scored overall wins in the Baja 1000 in his Chenowth VW in 1978 and 1980, and the car won just Class 1 (but not overall) in 1981. Stahl battled Frank "Scoop" Vessels for the win of the 1978 Baja 1000 and Vessels crossed the finish line 3 minutes ahead of Stahl - but had started 9 minutes earlier - giving the victory to Stahl by 6 minutes.

He moved to stock cars 1981, competing in the NASCAR Winston West Series; he competed in the series full-time in 1982, finishing 12th in points. Stahl also made his debut in the Winston Cup Series in 1981, driving in the Winston Western 500 at Riverside International Raceway, finishing 23rd.

Stahl competed in 30 races in the Winston Cup Series between 1981 and 1993; his best finish was 16th in 1986 at Darlington Raceway. He also failed to qualify for 32 additional events. In 1987 Stahl posted the fastest time in second-round qualifying for the 1987 Winston 500, becoming part of the fastest field in NASCAR history. He moved to South Carolina in 1991 to further his racing career. In 1990 Stahl acquired sponsorship from Hooters; his failing to qualify for the 1991 Motorcraft 500 at Atlanta International Raceway led to 1992 Winston Cup Series Champion Alan Kulwicki picking up the sponsorship for the event, and later receiving the sponsorship full-time. Stahl left NASCAR with more DNQs (33) than races run (30).

In 1988 Stahl made his debut in the Automobile Racing Club of America's Permatex SuperCar Series; he competed in 48 ARCA events between 1988 and 2001, posting a best finish of fourth at Talladega Superspeedway in 1997.

Following the 2001 racing season, Stahl retired from competition; in 2007, he came out of retirement to compete in the Baja 1000 once more, co-driving with Jim Christensen and winning the Touring Car class of the race. His 1977 Chenowth was restored by another driver for the 2011 NORRA Mexican 1000 vintage race and Stahl co-drove in the May event.

Motorsports career results

NASCAR
(key) (Bold – Pole position awarded by qualifying time. Italics – Pole position earned by points standings or practice time. * – Most laps led.)

Winston Cup Series

ARCA Re/Max Series
(key) (Bold – Pole position awarded by qualifying time. Italics – Pole position earned by points standings or practice time. * – Most laps led.)

References

External links

Living people
1951 births
Racing drivers from San Diego
NASCAR drivers
ARCA Menards Series drivers
Off-road racing drivers
People from Beaufort County, South Carolina